Lorna Gladys Wing  (7 October 1928 – 6 June 2014) was an English psychiatrist. She was a pioneer in the field of childhood developmental disorders, who advanced understanding of autism worldwide, introduced the term Asperger syndrome in 1976 and was involved in founding the National Autistic Society (NAS) in the UK.

Early life
Lorna Gladys Tolchard was born at Gillingham, Kent to Royal Navy engineer Bernard Newberry Tolchard (1898–1968) and Gladys Ethel (died 1962), née Whittell. Following education at Chatham Grammar School for Girls, she commenced medical training at University College Hospital in 1949. After qualifying as a psychiatrist, her first post was at the Institute of Psychiatry, Maudsley Hospital, London (now part of King's College London).

Career
Although Wing trained as a medical doctor, specialising in psychiatry, her focus narrowed to childhood developmental disorders in 1959. At that time autism was thought to affect around 5 in 10,000 children, but its prevalence in the 2010s was considered to be around 1 in 100 following the awareness raised by Wing and her followers. Her research, particularly with her collaborator Judith Gould, now underpins thinking in the field of autism. They initiated the Camberwell Case Register to record all patients using psychiatric services in this area of London. The data accumulated by this innovative approach gave Wing the basis for her influential insight that autism formed a spectrum, rather than clearly differentiated disorders. They also set up the Centre for Social and Communication Disorders, the first integrated diagnostic and advice service for these conditions in the UK.

Wing was the author of many books and academic papers, including Asperger Syndrome: a Clinical Account, a February 1981 academic paper that popularised the research of Hans Asperger.

Along with some parents of autistic children, she founded the organisation now known as the National Autistic Society in the UK in 1962. She was a consultant to NAS Lorna Wing Centre for Autism until she died. She was also President of Autism Sussex.

In the 1995 New Year Honours list Wing was appointed Officer of the Order of the British Empire for 'services to the National Autistic Society'.

Personal life
Wing met her future husband John Wing (22 October 1923 – 18 April 2010) while they were dissecting the same body as medical students. Marrying in 1950, both specialised as psychiatrists, with John becoming a professor of psychiatry. It was following their realisation that their daughter Susie (1956–2005) was autistic that Lorna Wing became involved in researching developmental disorders, particularly autistic spectrum disorders.

Lorna Wing died on 6 June 2014 in Kent, aged 85.

Hans Asperger controversy 
Wing has faced controversy since the publication of Edith Sheffer's 2018 book, Asperger's Children, due to Wing's previous defense of using Hans Asperger's name for the "Asperger's Syndrome" diagnosis. According to a 2018 article by John Donvan for The Atlantic, Yale psychologist Fred Volkmar, another major figure in the autism field, was on the committee appointed to investigate whether "Asperger’s syndrome" merited inclusion in the Diagnostic and Statistical Manual (DSM) in 1993. Volkmar made phone call to the only person he knew who had ever met Asperger — Lorna Wing — and asked her whether she knew anything Hans Asperger's rumored ties to the Nazis. Wing, "shocked" at Volkmar's inquiry, had defended Asperger as a "religious man". According to researcher Herwig Czech, Asperger "hailed from Roman Catholic circles, and his orientation during the period of the [previous Austrian] system was strictly Catholic".

Donvan, the author of The Atlantic article, also included this information in his 2016 book, In a Different Key: The Story of Autism, in which he described Wing as "speaking of [Hans Asperger]'s deep Catholic faith and lifelong devotion to young people", and claimed that Wing had dismissed Asperger's Nazi ties on account that "he [Asperger] was a very religious man". Prior to Wing's popularization of "Asperger's Syndrome" in the 1980s and early 1990s, Donvan writes, "Asperger, dead for thirteen years [by 1993], [had] never [been] a great presence on the world stage, [and] remained a little-known figure".

Bibliography

Papers
 Wing, L. & Gould, J. (1979), "Severe Impairments of Social Interaction and Associated Abnormalities in Children: Epidemiology and Classification", Journal of Autism and Developmental Disorders, 9, pp. 11–29.
 Wing, L. (1980). "Childhood Autism and Social Class: a Question of Selection?", British Journal of Psychiatry, 137, pp. 410–17.
 
 Burgoine, E. & Wing, L. (1983), "Identical triplets with Asperger's Syndrome", British Journal of Psychiatry, 143, pp. 261–65.
 Wing, L. & Attwood, A. (1987), "Syndromes of Autism and Atypical Development", in Cohen, D. & Donnellan, A. (eds.), Handbook of Autism and Pervasive Disorders, New York, John Wiley & Sons.
 Wing, L. (1991), "The Relationship Between Asperger's Syndrome and Kanner's Autism", in Frith, U. (ed.), Autism and Asperger Syndrome, Cambridge, Cambridge University Press.
 Wing, L. (1992), "Manifestations of Social Problems in High Functioning Autistic People", in Schopler, E. & Mesibov, G. (eds.), High Functioning Individuals with Autism, New York, Plenum Press.

Books
 1964, Autistic Children
 1966, Physiological Measures, Sedative Drugs and Morbid Anxiety, with M.H. Lader
 1969, Children Apart: Autistic Children and Their Families
 1969, Teaching Autitistic Autistic Children: Guidelines for Teachers
 1971, Autistic Children: a Guide for Parents
 1975, Early Childhood Autism: Clinical, Educational and Social Aspects (editor)
 1975, What is Operant conditioning?
 1988, Aspects of Autism: Biological Research (editor)
 1989, Hospital Closure and the Resettlement of Residents: Case of Darenth Park Mental Handicap Hospital
 1995, Autistic Spectrum Disorders: an Aid to Diagnosis
 1996, The Autistic Spectrum: a Guide for Parents and Professionals
 2002, Smiling at Shadows: a Mother's Journey Raising an Autistic Child (with Junee Waites, Helen Swinbourne).

References

External links
 National Autistic Society

1928 births
2014 deaths
Autism activists
Autism researchers
English psychiatrists
Fellows of the Royal College of Psychiatrists
Officers of the Order of the British Empire
British women psychiatrists